"Getto Jam" is a song performed by American rapper Domino. It was released on November 16, 1993 through Outburst Records as the lead single from his debut studio album Domino. Written by Domino and DJ Battlecat, it was recorded at Skip Saylor in Hollywood and produced by Battlecat with co-production from Domino.

In the United States, the single became a hit upon its release, reaching No. 7 on the Billboard Hot 100, No. 4 on the Hot R&B/Hip-Hop Songs, No. 1 on the Hot Rap Songs, and No. 27 on the Radio Songs. It was certified gold by the Recording Industry Association of America on January 5, 1994 for selling 500,000 copies. It also peaked at No. 25 in New Zealand and No. 33 on the UK Singles Chart.

Music video was directed by William Boyd.

The song has appeared on several of Def Jam's greatest hits compilations including 1995's Def Jam Music Group Inc.: 10th Year Anniversary and 1997's Total Def Jam. It was also later used in the 1994 film House Party 3, 1995 film Losing Isaiah, and 1999 film In Too Deep.

Track listing

Personnel
Shawn "Domino" Ivy — rapping vocals, songwriter, co-producer
Kevin "Battlecat" Gilliam — keyboards, programming, songwriter, producer, mixing
Robert "Fonksta" Bacon — guitar, bass
Louie Teran — engineering
Sean Freehill — mixing
Wallace "Wally T." Traugott — mastering
Anthony "Anti" Lewis — executive producer
"Big Bass" Brian Walker — executive producer
Greedy Greg — executive producer

Charts

Weekly charts

Year-end charts

Certifications

References

External links

1993 songs
G-funk songs
1993 debut singles
Domino (rapper) songs
Def Jam Recordings singles
Songs written by Battlecat (record producer)
Song recordings produced by Battlecat (record producer)